The Panamanian Professional Baseball League, currently known as Probeis, is a professional baseball winter league consisting of three teams based in Panama. Since 2019, the league's winner takes part in the Caribbean Series.

History
Founded in 1946, the PPBL joined Organized Baseball in 1948 and operated continuously until 1972.
A new Panamanian baseball league started the 2001–02 season as Probeis (Liga Profesional de Béisbol de Panamá), but it lasted that season only. By 2010, Los Angeles Dodgers related businessmen restarted the league as LPB (Professional Baseball League), but had poor logistics and operations lasted only one season.In 2011 Probeis made its second run since 2001.

1948–60

Champion teams

Notes
 The Carta Vieja, Chesterfield, Comercios and Marlboro teams represented Panama City, while Spur Cola was based in Colon.
 The Azucareros and Cerveza Balboa teams were sponsored from the cities of Aguadulce and Balboa, respectively.
 More of the games were played at Estadio Olímpico de Panamá in Panama City.

Carta Vieja Yankees
The league's champion team played in the Caribbean Series in its first stage from 1949 through 1960, before Fidel Castro dismantled the Cuban Winter League and replaced it with a new amateur circuit.

The Carta Vieja Yankees, one of the most distinguished clubs in the circuit, won five titles spanning 1950–58 and also captured the 1950 Caribbean Series, to become the only Panamanian team to a win a Series championship in the 20th Century.

Throughout its 12-year history, the team featured players as Wayne Blackburn, Chet Brewer, Webbo Clarke, Jim Cronin, Jerry Davie, Carl Duser, Marion Fricano, Milt Graff, Bill Harris, Spook Jacobs, Connie Johnson, Spider Jorgensen, Héctor López, Bobby Prescott, Humberto Robinson, Jean-Pierre Roy,  Pat Scantlebury, Billy Shantz, Joe Tuminelli and Jim Umbricht, among others.

Probeis

2001–02
Four teams participated during the 2001–02 season: Canaleros de Panamá, Macheteros de Azuero, Roneros de Carta Vieja and Tiburones Atlas de Panamá Oeste. Carta Vieja was the champion team, while Olmedo Sáenz won the batting title (.331) and Miguel Gómez was the best pitcher (5-0).

2011-12
Roneros Carta Vieja won their second Probeis title.

2012-13
Caballos de Coclé won first title and Javier Castillo was selected as MVP with 0.397 Avg.
Caballos de Coclé as champion represented Panama in the first Serie Latinoamericana held in Veracruz, Mexico, reaching third place.
Industriales de Herrera replaced Diablicos de Azuero for the 2012 tournament.

Teams for 2021-2022 season

2022 Caribbean Series roster

Champion teams

LPB 2010
In 2010, Major League Baseball authorized Augusto Ávila Penabad and Rafael Ávila (at the time a vice president with the Los Angeles Dodgers) to run a new winter professional baseball league. The Liga Profesional de Beisbol or known as LPB started under the sponsorship of Claro with four teams: Los Santos, Herrera, Veraguas and Panama. The league lasted only one season due to poor logistics, economics and no support from main TV stations. Only UHF RCM Television bought the TV rights. Season ran from December 12, 2009 until February 15, 2010.

References

External links
Liga Profesional de Béisbol de Panamá (Probeis) – Official site (Spanish)
Probeis Panama on Twitter
Baseball Reference – Pacific Northwest League Encyclopedia and History
Mop-Up Duty – Baseball in Panama

Baseball competitions in Panama
Baseball leagues in North America
Latin American baseball leagues
Sports leagues established in 1946
Winter baseball leagues
Sports leagues in Panama
 
1946 establishments in North America